Caer Gybi was a small fortlet in Roman Wales in the Roman province of Britannia Superior. Its name in Latin is unknown. Today it stands at the centre of Holyhead in the Welsh county of Anglesey. Holyhead is named Caergybi in Welsh, after the fort.

The fort is one of Europe's only three-walled Roman forts. The fourth side fronted the sea and was probably the site of a quay. Its date is unknown, but it is generally thought to be part of a late-4th-century scheme, associated with Segontium, which was used to defend the west coast against Irish sea-raiders. The Romans also built a watch tower, within Mynydd y Twr on the top of Holyhead Mountain, which was almost certainly used as the fort's look-out point. Both were possibly abandoned around 393, when the troops were sent to respond to the revolt of Eugenius of Gaul.

In the 6th century, the old fort was given to Saint Cybi, who founded a monastery there. The Church of St Cybi still stands on the site today, with a small detached chapel (Eglwys y Bedd) that reputedly stands over Cybi's grave.

References

External links

Holyhead
Roman fortifications in Anglesey
Archaeological sites in Anglesey
Scheduled monuments in Anglesey
Cadw
Roman legionary fortresses in Wales